Ana Veselinova (born 7 October 1995) is a Macedonian footballer who plays as a defender for the North Macedonia national team.

International career
Veselinova made her debut for the North Macedonia national team on 13 February 2014, against Spain.

References

1995 births
Living people
Women's association football defenders
Macedonian women's footballers
North Macedonia women's international footballers